Silas Belden Dutcher (July 12, 1829 – February 10, 1909) was the New York State Superintendent of Public Works.

Biography
He was born on July 12, 1829, in Springfield, New York. Dutcher attended the Cazenovia Academy. He served as the New York State Superintendent of Public Works from 1880 to 1883. He died on February 10, 1909, in Brooklyn, New York.

References

1829 births
1909 deaths
New York State Superintendents of Public Works
People from Springfield, New York
Cazenovia College alumni